is a Japanese former cyclist. He competed in the team pursuit event at the 1984 Summer Olympics and 1982 Asian Games.

References

External links
 

1962 births
Living people
Japanese male cyclists
Olympic cyclists of Japan
Cyclists at the 1984 Summer Olympics
Sportspeople from Iwate Prefecture
Asian Games medalists in cycling
Cyclists at the 1982 Asian Games
Asian Games gold medalists for Japan
Medalists at the 1982 Asian Games